Meedin, also Meedian, is a village and townland in County Westmeath, Ireland. It is located in the south of the county on the N52 road, to the north of Tyrrellspass and Rochfortbridge and to the south of Mullingar.

The village contains a 19th-century church, dating back to 1831, dedicated to the Sacred Heart.

People 

 Tomás Malone, Irish War of Independence veteran
Séamas Ó Maoileoin, Irish War of Independence veteran
 Seosamh Ó Mhaoileoin, president of Republican Sinn Fein
Fr Timothy Shanley, Catholic priest

See also 

 List of towns and villages in Ireland
 Tyrrellspass

References 

Towns and villages in County Westmeath